A long pause may refer to:

 A long rest in music.
 A period of 1,000 years in Polynesian history in which no ocean voyaging took place.